The North Harbour Rugby Union club rugby title has been contested since the formation of the North Harbour Rugby Union in New Zealand in 1985. The current trophy awarded to the winner is the ASB Bank Cup. The Premier Grade championship cup has also been named the New Zealand Couriers Cup  The current champions are North Shore RFC. The Reserve Grade Championship Cup is named the "Stuart Cup" after North Shore Rugby Club stalwart Jim Stuart who donated the Cup to the North Harbour Rugby Union in 1985. From 1985 to 1996 Harbour club finals were contested at Onewa Domain. Since 1997 all Club finals have been held at North Harbour Stadium. Club finals are usually held in July.

East Coast Bays won the inaugural title in 1985. The most successful team in the competitions history is Takapuna, the current champions, who have won the title 13 times including 7 straight titles from 1994 to 2000 and 4 titles from 2006 to 2009. North Shore have won the title 7 times, with Massey winning 6 titles, and with Northcote winning 5. Takapuna RFC and North Shore RFC are the 2 only Harbour clubs that have won an Auckland RFU Premiership, Shore in 1899 and Takapuna in 1940 and 1980. Takapuna is the only club of the 2 that has been awarded the Gallaher Shield.

As of 2022, Glenfield RFC, North Harbour Marist RFC, Mahurangi RFC and Kumeu RFC are yet to win a Premiership. In 2012 a combined Kumeu and Helensville team called the Western Pioneers won a premiership when they defeated Silverdale at North Harbour Stadium. Both clubs went their separate ways in 2015. 

As of 2022, some teams that previously played in the premier one grade - such as Royal Navy RFC, Glenfield RFC, and Marist North Harbour RFC - no longer have teams in the grade. Most clubs, with the exclusion of the latter, field teams in the premier 2 competition instead.

Only three clubs across the grades have won over ten Championships. Takapuna Premiers with 13 Premierships, North Shore Senior Reserves with 13 Reserve Grade championships and Takapuna Under 21s with 10 Under 21 Championships.

Jointly, between most North Harbour clubs, there is a premier women's team - entered in the wider Auckland women's grade - the Albany Barbarians.

North Harbour Secondary Schools 1st XV Rugby 
Since 1985 the North Harbour secondary schools rugby competition has been run during the winter rugby season. The most successful school in this competition is Westlake Boys' High School who has won 17 championships since 1988. Westlake's closest rival is Rosmini College with 8 championships. Takapuna Grammar is the only school in this competition that won an Auckland Secondary schools 1st XV competition when they shared a championship with Auckland Grammar in 1941.

The biggest rivalry in the competition is between Westlake Boys' High School and Rosmini College. Westlake Boys' High School is an all-boys state school located in the suburb of Forrest Hill, whilst Rosmini College is a state integrated catholic boys' school located slightly south in the suburb of Takapuna. The schools are located less than 2.1 km apart. The first known game between Westlake Boys and Rosmini took place in 1980 with Rosmini winning that day 18 points to 7.

In recent seasons Manurewa High School (from Counties Manukau) and Whangarei Boys High school (from Northland) have joined the NHSS 1st XV competition. Whangarei Boys High School made the final for the first time in 2019 and lost to Westlake Boys'.

The Woodhouse Shield is the NHSS rugby equivalent of the Ranfurly shield. The current holder of the shield is Westlake Boys' High School.

The eight schools that currently compete in the NHSS 1st XV competition, and their number of championship wins, are:

Westlake BHS (17), Rosmini College (8), Massey High School (6), Rangitoto College (2), Takapuna Grammar (2), Whangarei BHS (0), Manurewa High School (0).

Over recent years, the number of participating teams in the 1A competition has dropped, with the following teams - bar the last two - now competing in the NHSS 1B competition alongside 2nd XV teams from Rosmini and Westlake Boys':
Birkenhead College, Northcote College, Long Bay College, Whangaparaoa College, Hato Petera College, Glenfield College.

The girls' equivalent to 1st XV secondary school rugby is the 12-a-side Youth 17 competition.

North Harbour Club Rugby Titles and Runners-up

North Harbour Club Rugby Finals

 GP signifies that the game went to Golden Point. Massey won the title in 2016 with a drop goal after the scores were tied 23–23 at the end of 80 minutes.

Senior Reserves/Senior B/ The Stuart Cup

1985	East Coast Bays(1)-Runners up Northcote

1986	North Shore (1)-Runners up East Coast Bays

1987	North Shore (2)	-Runners up East Coast Bays

1988	East Coast Bays (2)-Runners up North Shore 	

1989	North Shore (3)-Runners up Northcote

1990	East Coast Bays(3)Runners up 		

1991	East Coast Bays(4)-Runners up Takapuna 	

1992	East Coast Bays(5)-Runners up Takapuna 	

1993	East Coast Bays(6)-Runners up Massey 	

1994	Takapuna(1)-Runners up Massey 	

1995	Massey(1)-Runners up Takapuna

1996	Massey(2)-Runners up Takapuna

1997	Takapuna(2)-Runners up Glenfield

1998	North Shore(4)-Runners up Takapuna	

1999	Takapuna(3)-Runners up Northcote 		

2000	North Shore(5)-Runners up East Coast Bays

2001	East Coast Bays(7)-Runners up North Shore 	

2002	North Shore(6)-Runners up East Coast Bays

2003	Massey(3)-Runners up North Shore	

2004	Massey(4)-Runners up Silverdale	

2005	Massey(5)-Runners up Northcote

2006	North Shore(7)-Runners up Massey

2007    Northcote(1)-Runners up North Shore

2008	North Shore(8)-Runners up Northcote	

2009    Marist(1)-Runners up East Coast Bays

2010	North Shore(9)-Runners up Massey	

2011	Silverdale(1)-Runners up Northcote	

2012	North Shore(10)-Runners up East Coast Bays 	

2013	Northcote (2)-Runners up North Shore	

2014	North Shore(11)-Runners up Northcote	

2015	Northcote(3)-Runners up North Shore

2016	North Shore(12)-Runners up Northcote	

2017	Northcote(4)-Runners up Kumeu	

2018	Northcote(5)-Runners up East Coast Bays 	

2019    North Shore (13)-Runners up East Coast Bays

2020    Season abandoned due to COVID-19

2021    Northcote (6)-Runners up Takapuna

Under 21 Championships

1985	Takapuna (1)	

1986	Takapuna (2)

1987	Glenfield(1)	

1988	East Coast Bays(1)	

1989	East Coast Bays(2)		

1990	East Coast Bays(3)	

1991    Takapuna (3)

1992	East Coast Bays(4)	

1993	Massey(1)	

1994	North Shore (1)	

1995	Takapuna (4)	

1996	Takapuna (5)	

1997	Takapuna (6)	

1998	North Shore(2)	

1999	Takapuna (7)	

2000	Marist (1)

2001	Takapuna (8)	

2002	Northcote (1)	

2003	Northcote (2)	

2004	Silverdale (1)	

2005	Northcote (3)

2006	Takapuna (9)

2007    Massey (2)

2008	Glenfield(2)	

2009    North Shore(3)

2010	North Shore(4)	

2011	Silverdale (2)	

2012	Takapuna(10) 	

2013	Northcote (4)	

2014	Kumeu (1)

2015	Northcote (5)

2016	Kumeu (2)

2017	East Coast Bays (5)

2018	East Coast Bays (6)

2019    East Coast Bays (7)

2020    Season abandoned due to COVID-19

2021    East Coast Bays (8)

North Harbour Secondary schools Rugby First XV 

1985	Birkenhead College (1)	

1986	Hato Petera College  (1)

1987	Rosmini College(1)	

1988	Westlake Boys High School (1)	

1989	Westlake Boys High School (2)		

1990	Rangitoto College (1)	

1991    Rangitoto College (2)

1992	Massey High School (1)

1993	Rosmini College	(2)

1994	Rosmini College (3)	

1995	Westlake Boys High School (3)	

1996	Westlake Boys High School (4)	

1997	Westlake Boys High School (5)	

1998	Westlake Boys High School (6)	

1999	Massey High School (2)	

2000	Westlake Boys High School (7)

2001	Rosmini College (4)

2002	Massey High School (3)

2003	Rosmini College (5)

2004	Massey High School (4)	

2005	Westlake Boys High School (8)

2006	Westlake Boys High School (9)

2007    Massey High School (5)/Takapuna Grammar (1)(shared)

2008	Westlake Boys High School (10)

2009    Rosmini College (6)

2010	Westlake Boys High School (11)	

2011	Massey High School (6)	

2012	Westlake Boys High School (12)

2013	Westlake Boys High School (13)	

2014	Westlake Boys High School (14)

2015	Rosmini College	(7)

2016	Westlake Boys High School (15)	

2017	Rosmini College (8)

2018	Westlake Boys High School (16)/Takapuna Grammar (2) shared

2019    Westlake Boys High School (17)

2020    Season abandoned due to COVID-19

2021    Season abandoned due to COVID-19

References

Rugby union in the Auckland Region